Stories Old and New, also known by its later name Stories to Enlighten the World (喻世明言), is a collection of short stories by Feng Menglong during the Ming dynasty. It was published in Suzhou in 1620. It is considered to be pivotal in the development of Chinese vernacular fiction.

Background
Feng Menglong collected and slightly modified works from the Song, Yuan and Ming dynasties, such as changing characters’ names and locations to make stories more contemporary.  The writing style of the series of stories is written vernacular, or baihua, the everyday language of people at that time. The 40 stories are divided into 3 sections, one section collects Song and Yuan dynasty tales, one collects Ming dynasty stories, and the last is the stories created by Feng Menglong himself. The success of  Stories Old and New published (1620), also known as Yushi Mingyan (Illustrious Words to Instruct the World) led Feng to edit and publish JIngshi Tongyan (Stories to Caution the World) in 1624, and Xingshi Hengyan (Stories to Awaken the World) in 1627. Each collection contained forty stories. The title of each collection ended with the word "yan" (word), so they are often referred to as a group: Sanyan. The stories in these three books are in a format called Huaben (话本), a novella or short novel.

About the author
Feng Menglong (1574－1646) passed the lowest level of national exams at the age of 57. Although he had not done well on previous exams, he did have the ability to impress people with his writings. When he was 70, the dynasty was almost at its end and the Qing army invaded the country. He attempted to awaken people with his writings but failed to do so, and died in 1646. There are two theories about how he died. One is that he was killed by the Qing forces and another that his worries about the country made him sick.

Feng's works included not only fiction but drama and music as well. He played a major role in enhancing Ming dynasty drama and brought it into a thriving state. Nevertheless, he was mostly known for his fiction. The motivation and central idea of his work was illustrating real emotion and undermining false ethics. One common characteristic of Feng's works is realism, dealing with daily life so that readers feel close to the story and enjoy reading it.

List of Stories
Translated titles in this table mainly follow those by Shuhui Yang and Yunqin Yang in  Titles used by other translators are listed as bullet points.

Notes

Chinese short story collections
Chinese anthologies
1620 books
Short stories by Feng Menglong